El Ard el Tayeba (aliases: The Good Land or The Good Earth, translit. Al-Ard Al-Tayyiba) is a 1954 Egyptian film written, directed and produced by Mahmoud Zulfikar.

Synopsis
Saadia discovers that she is the daughter of a rich man and has a huge inheritance after his death. Her stepmother Baheega hates her, specially after Saadia became a rich girl. Baheega plots to kill Saadia to win her inheritance with the help of her lover and her brother. Here come the good man Hussein to rescue her.

Crew
 Directed by: Mahmoud Zulfikar
 Story: Mahmoud Zulfikar
 Screenplay: Mahmoud Zulfikar, Youssef Gohar
 Production: Mahmoud Zulfikar
 Editing: Albert Naguib
 Production company: Amir Film (Mahmoud Zulfikar)
 Distribution: National Company for Distribution and Trade

Main cast 

 Mariam Fakhr Eddine as Saadia
 Kamal El-Shennawi as Hussein Heshmat
 Hussein Riad as El Pasha
 Zuzu Madi as Baheega
 Abdel Salam Al Nabulsy as Zaki
 Soraya Fakhri as Hassanein's wife
 Fouad El-Mohandes as Bassiouni
 Abdulaziz Ahmed as Hassanein

References

External links 

 El Ard el Tayeba on elCinema

 

Egyptian black-and-white films
1954 films
1954 drama films
Egyptian drama films
1950s Arabic-language films
Films directed by Mahmoud Zulfikar